The Czarny Dunajec is a river in southern Poland (Lesser Poland Voivodeship), in the Vistula basin.

Course
The Wyżni Chochołowski Potok is considered the source of the Czarny Dunajec river. It flows out at an altitude of about  under Volovec in the Western Tatras. After the merger with the Jarząbcze Potok, the Chochołowski Potok is formed, called Siwa Woda in the lower part. It is the middle course of Czarny Dunajec. In Roztoki (part of the village of Witów), Siwa Woda connects with Kirowa Woda and the lower course of the Czarny Dunajec begins here.

The Czarny Dunajec flows through Podhale, initially to the north-west, between Pogórze Gubałowskie and Orawicko-Witowskie Wierchy, then north through the Orava-Nowy Targ Basin. It makes a wide arc and flows to the east. It flows through the following towns: Witów, Chochołów, Koniówka, Podczerwone, Czarny Dunajec, Wróblówka, Długopole, Krauszów and Ludźmierz. In Nowy Targ it joins the Biały Dunajec river, creating the Dunajec.

Tributaries
Larger tributaries in the sequence of the river:
 left: Przybylanka, Magurski Potok, Greków Potok, Garczków Potok, Chrobaków Potok, Domagalski Potok, Siców Potok, Piekielnik, Lepietnica, Potoczek, Klikuszówka, Skotnica, Kowaniec
 right: Kirowa Woda, Antałowski Potok, Wielki Głęboki Potok, Szymonów Potok, Bobków Potok, Mały Głęboki Potok, Iwański Potok, Gawronów Potok, Dzianiski Potok, Zagrodzianka, Młynówka, Czarny Potok, Czerwony Potok, Wielki Rogoźnik

In its upper part (down to the village of Czarny Dunajec) it has the character of a mountain river; there are numerous weirs in its bed in this section. Downstream, in the Orava-Nowy Targ Basin, the river slows down and behaves like lowland rivers; it produces bends and side branches.

Fly fishing is allowed along the entire length of the river, but only outside the buffer zone of the Tatra National Park (below the mouth of the Iwański Potok). The river mainly contains brown trout, less common grayling and chub.

See also 
 List of rivers of Poland

References

External links 
 

Rivers of Poland